Bis (2,4-dinitrophenyl) oxalate (DNPO) is a source of 1,2-dioxetanedione, a chemical used in glow sticks.  Other chemicals related to DNPO used in glow sticks include bis(2,4,6-trichlorophenyl)oxalate (TCPO) and bis(2,4,5-trichlorophenyl-6-carbopentoxyphenyl)oxalate (CPPO).

References

Oxalate esters
Nitrobenzenes
Phenol esters
Chemiluminescence